Sviatoslav III Vsevolodovych (Ukrainian and Russian: Святослав III Всеволодич) (died 1194), Prince of Turov (1142 and 1154), Volyn (1141–1146), Pinsk (1154), Novhorod-Siverskyi (1157–1164), Chernihiv (1164–1177), Grand Prince of Kiev (1174, 1177–1180, 1182–1194). He was the son of Vsevolod II Olgovich.

He succeeded in taking the Kievan throne from Yaroslav II, and ruled Kiev alongside Rurik Rostislavich until his death.  The co-princedom did not go smoothly and there were disagreements between Sviatoslav and Rurik, until Sviatoslav was taken ill and died on 27 July 1194.

Notes and references

1126 births
1194 deaths
People from Chernihiv
Grand Princes of Kiev
Rurik dynasty
12th-century princes in Kievan Rus'
Eastern Orthodox monarchs
Olgovichi family